Cottus is a genus of the mainly freshwater ray-finned fishes belonging to the family Cottidae, the typical sculpins. They are often referred to as the "freshwater sculpins", as they are the principal genus of sculpins to be found in fresh water. They are native to the Palearctic and Nearctic.

Taxonomy
Cottus was first proposed as a genus by Carl Linnaeus in the 10th edition of the Systema Naturae when he described the European bullhead (Cottus gobio) and in 1850 this species was designated as the type species of the genus by the French ichthyologist Charles Frédéric Girard. The 5th edition of the Fishes of the World classifies this genus within the subfamily Cottinae of the family Cottidae. Other authorities have found that the Cottidae, as delimited in the 5th edition of Fishes of the World, is paraphyletic and that the monophyletic grouping is the freshwater sculpins, including the Baikal sculpins, while most of the marine taxa are classified within the family Psychrolutidae. 
 Cottus kazika has been found to be outside of a monophyletic Cottus and has been classified in the monospecific genus Rheopresbe.

Species
There are currently around 70 recognised species in this genus:

 Subgenus Cottus Linnaeus, 1758
 Cottus aturi Freyhof, Kottelat & Nolte, 2005
 Cottus cyclophthalmus Sideleva, Kesminas & Zhidkov, 2022
 Cottus duranii Freyhof, Kottelat &  Norte, 2005 (Dordogne sculpin)
 Cottus dzungaricus Kottelat, 2006
 Cottus ferrugineus Heckel & Kner, 1857
 Cottus gobio Linnaeus, 1758 (European bullhead)
 Cottus gratzianowi Sideleva, Naseka & Zhidkov, 2015
 Cottus haemusi Marinov & Dikov, 1986
 Cottus hispaniolensis Băcescu & Băcescu-Mester, 1964
 Cottus jaxartensis Berg, 1916
 Cottus koshewnikowi Gratzianov, 1907
 Cottus metae Freyhof, Kottelat & Nolte, 2005
 Cottus microstomus Heckel, 1837
 Cottus perifretum Freyhof, Kottelat & Nolte,, 2005
 Cottus petiti Băcescu & Băcescu-Mester,  1964
 Cottus rhenanus Freyhof, Kottelat & Nolte, 2005
 Cottus ricei E. W. Nelson, 1876 (Spoonhead sculpin)
 Cottus rondeleti Freyhof, Kottelat & Nolte, 2005
 Cottus sabaudicus Sideleva, 2009
 Cottus scaturigo Freyhof, Kottelat & Nolte, 2005
 Cottus sibiricus Kessler, 1889 (Siberian sculpin)
 Cottus spinulosus Kessler, 1872 (Turkestan sculpin)
 Cottus transsilvaniae Freyhof, Kottelat & Nolte, 2005
 Subgenus Cephalocottus Gratzianov, 1907 
 Cottus amblystomopsis P. Y. Schmidt, 1904 (Sakhalin sculpin)
 Cottus nozawae Snyder, 1911
 Subgenus Cottopsis Girard 1850
 Cottus aleuticus C. H. Gilbert, 1896 (Coast Range sculpin)
 Cottus asper J. Richardson, 1836 (Prickly sculpin)
 Cottus asperrimus Rutter, 1908 (Rough sculpin)
 Cottus gulosus Girard, 1854 (Inland riffle sculpin)
 Cottus klamathensis C. H. Gilbert, 1898 (Marbled sculpin)
 Cottus ohlone Moyle & Campbell, 2022 (Coastal riffle sculpin)
 Cottus perplexus C. H. Gilbert & Evermann, 1894 (Reticulate sculpin)
 Cottus pitensis R. M. Bailey & C. E. Bond, 1963 (Pit sculpin)
 Cottus princeps C. H. Gilbert, 1898 (Klamath Lake sculpin)
 Cottus tenuis Evermann & Meek, 1898 (Slender sculpin)
 Subgenus Uranidea DeKay, 1842
 Cottus baileyi C. R. Robins, 1961 (Black sculpin)
 Cottus bairdii Girard, 1850 (Mottled sculpin)
 Cottus bendirei T. H. Bean, 1881 (Malheur sculpin)
 Cottus caeruleomentum Kinziger, Raesly & Neely, 2000 (Blue Ridge sculpin)
 Cottus carolinae T. N. Gill, 1861 (Banded sculpin)
 Cottus chattahoochee Neely, J. D. Williams & Mayden, 2007 (Chattahoochee sculpin)
 Cottus cognatus J. Richardson, 1836 (Slimy sculpin)
 Cottus echinatus R. M. Bailey & C. E. Bond, 1963 (Utah Lake sculpin)
 Cottus extensus R. M. Bailey & C. E. Bond, 1963 (Bear Lake sculpin)
 Cottus girardi C. R. Robins, 1961 (Potomac sculpin)
 Cottus hubbsi R. M. Bailey & Dimick, 1949 (Columbia sculpin)
 Cottus hypselurus C. R. Robins & H. W. Robison, 1985 (Ozark sculpin)
 Cottus immaculatus Kinziger & R. M. Wood, 2010 (Knobfin sculpin)
 Cottus kanawhae C. R. Robins, 2005 (Kanawha sculpin)
 Cottus paulus J. D. Williams, 2000 (Pygmy sculpin)
 Cottus rhotheus R. Smith, 1882 (Torrent sculpin)
 Cottus specus G. L. Adams & Burr, 2013 (Grotto sculpin)
 Cottus tallapoosae Neely, J. D. Williams & Mayden, 2007 (Tallapoosa sculpin)
Subgenus Incertae sedis
 Cottus altaicus Kaschenko, 1899
 Cottus beldingii C. H. Eigenmann & R. S. Eigenmann, 1891 (Paiute sculpin)
 Cottus confusus R. M. Bailey & C. E. Bond, 1963 (Shorthead sculpin)
 Cottus czerskii L. S. Berg, 1913 (Cherskii's sculpin)
 Cottus greenei C. H. Gilbert & Culver, 1898 (Shoshone sculpin)
 Cottus hangiongensis T. Mori, 1930
 Cottus kazika D. S. Jordan & Starks, 1904 (Fourspine sculpin)
 Cottus kolymensis Sideleva & A. Goto, 2012
 Cottus koreanus R. Fujii, Y. Choi & Yabe, 2005
 Cottus kuznetzovi L. S. Berg, 1903
 Cottus leiopomus C. H. Gilbert & Evermann, 1894 (Wood River sculpin)
 Cottus marginatus T. H. Bean, 1881 (Margined sculpin)
 Cottus nasalis L. S. Berg, 1933 (Tubenose sculpin)
 Cottus perplexus C. H. Gilbert & Evermann, 1894 (Reticulate sculpin)
 Cottus poecilopus Heckel, 1837 (Alpine bullhead)
 Cottus pollux Günther, 1873 (Japanese fluvial sculpin)
 Cottus reinii Hilgendorf, 1879
 Cottus schitsuumsh M. Lemoine, M. K. Young, McKelvey, L. Eby, Pilgrim & M. K. Schwartz, 2014 (Cedar sculpin)
 Cottus szanaga Dybowski, 1869
 Cottus volki Taranetz, 1933

Etymology
Cottus is derived from the Greek kottos,  and is a latinisation that word, the original form of it being koviós or kóthos. This is likely to mean "head" and is the word for a small fish with a large head, and is now used for sculpins.

References

 
Cottinae
Taxa named by Carl Linnaeus
Freshwater fish genera